A multi-sport event is an organized sporting event, often held over multiple days, featuring competition in many different sports between organized teams of athletes from (mostly) nation-states. Events are typically held over a few days to accommodate the large number of events held, often more than those in single-sport competitions. The first major, modern, multi-sport event of international significance was the modern Olympic Games. Some of the most recognised sporting events in the world today are multi-sport events – the Asian Games, the Commonwealth Games, the Pan American Games and the Mediterranean Games – among others. This article lists all major multi-sport events, whether defunct or functioning, in the modern day. A full listing of all major multi-sport events is provided in the table below.

Transnational multi-sport events are often organised across concords of cultural elements between nations. These include language, such as the Francophone Games for French-speaking nations; ethnic, such as the Maccabiah Games for Jewish athletes; political, such as the Spartakiad used to oppose the Olympics; occupation, such as the Universiade for university students; and gender, such as World Outgames for the gay community. Participation is also delineated across other lines including region, religion, age, and season (winter instead of summer). A number of multi-sport events are held within nations, where athletes representing various intra-national states or districts compete against each other; these include the Thailand National Games and the National Games of China. These differences in intended audiences are highlighted in the table.

Historical 

Prior to the modern day, there were instances of multi-sport events held centuries or millennia in the past. The Tailteann Games, held near modern Telltown in Ireland, was one of the first multi-sport festivals to be recorded, with a history that traces back to 1829 BC. There were several other games held in Europe in the classical era. the Panhellenic Games encompassed the Ancient Olympic Games, which was the precursor to the modern Olympic Games; the Pythian Games; the Nemean Games; and the Isthmian Games. The Roman Games, held in ancient Rome, focused on Greek sports as well as the Etruscan sport of gladiatorial combat. Other multi-sport festivals emerged in the Middle Ages in Europe, including the Cotswold Olimpick Games in England, the Highland games in Scotland still in existence today, and the Olympiade de la République in France in the 19th century.

As these multi-sport events or festivals occurred pre-20th century, when the rules for today's modern sports were largely different or yet to be established, these are not included in the table. The events noted in this section documents all known historical multi-sport events.

Scope 
Multi-sport events can be classified by scope. Some cater to international audiences; some to regional audiences; and some are held within nations. These differences are presented in the table as well, in addition to other divisions such as ethnicity and historical origins as described earlier.

Only a few modern multi-sport events cater to international audiences without cultural or political boundaries. The most famous of these is the Olympic Games. The others are namely the World Games, established to host sports not within the Olympic scope; the World Mind Sports Games, which hosts competitions in mind sports which are not found in either of the two abovementioned events; the X Games and the Winter X Games, organised for extreme action sports; the World Combat Games, for martial arts and combat sports; and the now-cancelled Goodwill Games.

Similarly, there are also regional multi-sport events held that purely cater to regional audiences regardless of cultural and/or political elements. These are often grouped by continent and sub-continental regions. Each continent has at least one major continental Games; the Asian Games are held for athletes in Asia; In Africa, the African Games perform the same continental function, and  In the Americas, the largest multi-sport event that fits the description is the Pan American Games; countries in Oceania compete in the Pacific Games, while Europe has two similar events, the European Games organised by the European Olympic Committees in the tradition of the Olympic Games, and the European Championships , organised by a group of European sports federations.

On a sub-continental and regional level, the Central Asian Games, the East Asian Games, the South Asian Games and the Southeast Asian Games cater to Central Asia, East Asia, South Asia and Southeast Asia respectively, which are all regions of the Asian continent.. The various regions of the Americas are catered for by the South American Games, the Central American and Caribbean Games and the Central American Games. The Games of the Small States of Europe caters for the various island nations and micronations around Europe, while Europe provides the majority of competitors in the Mediterranean Games.

List of major multi-sport events 
The criteria in listing a multi-sport event is as follows: The event should have received significant media coverage where it is covered; national, regional, or international. At the same time, organization of the event is taken charge by a formal body, with at least one sport in the event sanctioned by an international sports federation that is recognized by the International Olympic Committee or the General Association of International Sports Federations (GAISF).

Legend
1. Established – Year in which first edition was held  
2. Year in which last edition is held  
3. Recurrence (in years)  
4. Location where next edition is held
5. Cultural and/or political elements that limit audiences as intended (e.g. ethnicity, religion, gender, occupation)

Component games 
Provincial multi-sport events in Canada

 BC Games
 Alberta Games
 Saskatchewan Games
 Manitoba Games
 Ontario Games
 Jeux du Quebec
 East Coast Games of Saint John's

Provincial multi-sport events in Argentina

juegos bonaerenses
Juegos Deportivos Entrerrianos

Provincial multi-sport events in Chile

Juegos Juveniles del Norte Grande

National Congress of State Games 

Alabama: Alabama Sports Festival
Arizona: Grand Canyon State Games
California: California State Games
Colorado: Rocky Mountain State Games
Connecticut: Nutmeg State Games
Florida: Sunshine State Games
Georgia: Georgia Games
Hawaii: Aloha State Games
Idaho: Winter Games of Idaho, Summer Games of Idaho
Illinois: Prairie State Games
Indiana: State Games of Indiana
Iowa: Iowa Games
Kansas: Sunflower State Games
Kentucky: Bluegrass State Games
Maine: Maine Games
Massachusetts: Bay State Games
Minnesota: Star of the North Games
Mississippi: State Games of Mississippi
Missouri: Show-Me State Games
Montana: Big Sky State Games
Nebraska: Cornhusker State Games
New Hampshire: New Hampshire Amateur State Games
New Jersey: Garden State Games
New Mexico: New Mexico Games
New York: Empire State Games
North Carolina: State Games of North Carolina
North Dakota: Prairie Rose State Games
Oklahoma: Sooner State Games
Oregon: State Games of Oregon
Pennsylvania: Keystone State Games
Texas: Games of Texas
Utah: Utah Summer Games, Utah Winter Games
Virginia: Coventry Commonwealth Games of Virginia
Washington: Washington State Games
Wisconsin: Badger State Games
Wyoming: Cowboy State Games
State multi-sports events in Malaysia

 Federal Territories: Federal Territories Games (SWIP)
 Johor: Johor Unity Games
 Kedah: Kedah Darul Aman Games (SUKDA)
Kelantan: Kelantan Games Carnival (Kasukel)
 Perak: Perak Games Carnival (SUPER)
 Sabah: Sabah Games (SAGA)
 Sarawak: Sarawak Games (SUKSAR)
 Selangor: Selangor Games (SUKSES)
 Terengganu: Terengganu Games (SUTERA)
Provincial multi-sport events in South Korea

 Chungcheongbuk-do: Chungcheongbuk-do Sports Festival, Chungcheongbuk-do Junior Sports Festival
 Chungcheongnam-do: Chungcheongnam-do Sports Festival
Gangwon-dl: Gangwon-do Sports Festival
 Gyeongsangbuk-do: Gyeongsangbuk-do Sports Festival,  Gyeongsangbuk-do Students Sports Festival, Gyeongsangbuk-do Junior Sports Festival
 Gyeonggi-do: Gyeonggi-do Sports Festival
 Gyeongsangnam-do: Gyeongsangnam-do Sports Festival 
 Jeollabuk-do: Jeollabuk-do Sports Festival
Jeollanam-do: lJeollanam-do Sports Festival

See also
 International athletics championships and games
 World School Championships
 FISU World University Championships
 Multi-sport event
 Multiple-stage competition

References

External links 
 International Olympic Committee – Olympic Games, Paralympic Games, Youth Olympic Games
 Organisation Internationale de la Francophonie – Francophone Games
 Olympic Council of Asia – Asian Games, Asian Youth Games, Asian Beach Games, Asian Indoor-Martial Arts Games
 Commonwealth Games Federation – Commonwealth Games
 International Committee of Mediterranean Games – Mediterranean Games
 International University Sports Federation – Universiade
 International Island Games Association – Island Games
 World Transplant Games – Transplant Games

List